The Andreotti V Cabinet, led by Giulio Andreotti, was the 35th cabinet of the Italian Republic.

The government did not gain confidence in the Senate with a single vote: 149 senators voted in favor of the confidence motion and 150 against. Consequently, the executive resigned 11 days after his establishment.

Party breakdown
 Christian Democracy (DC): prime minister, 14 ministers, 39 undersecretaries
 Italian Democratic Socialist Party (PSDI): 3 ministers, 7 undersecretaries
 Italian Republican Party (PRI): 3 ministers, 4 undersecretaries

Composition

|}

References

Italian governments
1979 establishments in Italy
1979 disestablishments in Italy
Cabinets established in 1979
Cabinets disestablished in 1979
Andreotti 5 Cabinet